The 1979 World Table Tennis Championships women's doubles was the 34th edition of the women's doubles championship.
Zhang Li and Zhang Deying defeated Ge Xin'ai and Yan Guili in the final by three sets to nil.

Results

See also
List of World Table Tennis Championships medalists

References

-
1979 in women's table tennis